The M Countdown Chart is a record chart on the South Korean Mnet television music program M Countdown. Every week, the show awards the best-performing single on the chart in the country during its live broadcast.

In 2020, 33 singles ranked number one on the chart and 25 music acts received first-place trophies. Two songs collected trophies for three weeks and achieved a triple crown: "Wannabe" and "Not Shy", both by Itzy. Of all releases for the year, only two songs earned a perfect score of 11,000 points: "On" by BTS and "I'm in Trouble" by  NU'EST.

Scoring system

April 26, 2018 – May 21, 2020 
Scoring System: Digital Music Sales (45%), Album Sales (15%), Social Media Score (YouTube official music video views + SNS buzz) (20%), Global Fan Votes (10%), Mnet Broadcast Score (10%), SMS Live Vote 10%.

May 28, 2020 – present 
Scoring System: Digital Sales (Melon, Genie, FLO) (45%), Album Sales (15%), Social Media (YouTube MV views) (15%), Global Fan Vote (15%), Mnet Broadcast (Mnet TV, MCD Stage, M2 Contents) (10%), Live Vote (for 1st nominees only) (10%).

Chart history

References 

2020 in South Korean music
2020 record charts
Lists of number-one songs in South Korea